Erik C. Peterson is a United States Army lieutenant general who serves as the deputy chief of staff for programs of the United States Army since May 2021. Previously, he was director of force development of the same directorate, and prior to that was the Commanding General of First Army Division West.

References

External links

Year of birth missing (living people)
Living people
Place of birth missing (living people)
University of Idaho alumni
American Master Army Aviators
National War College alumni
United States Army generals